Great American Family is an American cable television network. Owned by Great American Media, it broadcasts family-oriented general entertainment programming, including television series and made-for-TV movies.

It was originally established in 1995 by Jones Radio Network as Great American Country (GAC), a country music channel. GAC was later acquired by Scripps Networks and, in turn, Discovery Inc. Under Scripps, GAC's format was widened to include lifestyle programming pertaining to the American Heartland and the South, but the network did continue carrying some country music-related programming for a period.

In June 2021, GAC was acquired by GAC Media—a new ownership group that includes former Crown Media CEO Bill Abbott and Hicks Equity Partners. On September 27, 2021, the network was relaunched as GAC Family (later Great American Family), with a format and original programming strategy mirroring Abbott's former employer Hallmark Channel, and leveraging talent previously associated with that network. The previous country lifestyle format was moved to Ride TV—a second channel acquired by GAC Media–which was concurrently relaunched as the sister network GAC Living. In 2022, Abbott described the network as featuring a mix of secular and "soft" faith-based programming.

As of February 2015, GAC was available to approximately 59 million television households (51% of pay television customers) in the United States.

History

As Great American Country 

The channel was launched on December 31, 1995, with the first music video to be broadcast on the channel, Garth Brooks' "The Thunder Rolls". The channel was originally owned by the Centennial, Colorado-based Jones Radio Network.

On October 12, 2004, Scripps Networks acquired Great American Country from Jones Radio Network.

In late 2005, television industry trade publication Broadcasting & Cable named GAC as one of TV's "Breakout Networks", saying of the channel: "The emerging GAC is a younger, hipper version [of CMT] that respects Nashville's country roads but widens the boulevards."

In December 2007, the network announced a partnership with ABC Radio Networks (now Cumulus Media Networks) to produce GAC Nights: Live from Nashville, a syndicated country music radio show broadcast from GAC's Music Row studios and hosted by GAC personalities Suzanne Alexander, Storme Warren, and Nan Kelley.

In July 2008, Scripps Networks was spun off from the E. W. Scripps Company as Scripps Networks Interactive.

On October 1, 2013, the network unveiled a new logo inspired by the U.S. flag, dropping the "GAC" acronym in favor of using the "Great American Country" name in full. The network stated that it wanted to emphasize its expansion from a country music-oriented channel to one with a larger emphasis on "country" as referring to a "sense of place" and lifestyles (citing programming such as Celebrity Motor Homes and Farm Kings as examples). With the channel's rebranding, the daily music video show Daily Countdown was renamed Great American Playlist. Top 20 Country Countdown continued to air (it was cancelled in December 2018), and the network still offered country music specials including Backstory, Introducing and Origins.

In March 2018, Discovery Inc. acquired Scripps Networks Interactive.

As GAC Family/Great American Family 

On June 7, 2021, GAC Media, a Fort Worth-based investment group led by private equity investor Tom Hicks and former Crown Media Holdings CEO Bill Abbott announced that it would acquire Great American Country from Discovery Inc.; the company had recently announced its intent to merge with WarnerMedia. GAC Media would also acquire the equestrian network Ride TV. Abbott had abruptly stepped down from Crown Media in January 2020, shortly after Hallmark Channel was criticized for pulling commercials from the wedding registry Zola that included a lesbian couple.

In August 2021, GAC Media announced that it would relaunch Great American Country as GAC Family on September 27, with the GAC initials re-backronymed to stand for "Great American Channels"; The channel was repositioned as a family-oriented general entertainment service with similarities to Hallmark Channel, which Abbot had previously overseen as Crown Media CEO. The previous country lifestyle format was assumed by Ride TV, which concurrently rebranded as the sister channel GAC Living.

GAC Family would mirror many of the programming strategies that Abbott developed while overseeing Hallmark Channel, including original made-for-TV movies and holiday programming. In the months following its launch, GAC Media signed contracts with talent associated with Hallmark Channel productions, including Trevor Donovan, Jen Lilley, Jessica Lowndes, Jesse Metcalfe, and Danica McKellar, to appear in GAC Family original movies. Former Home & Family hosts Debbie Matenopoulos and Cameron Mathison hosted a preview special for GAC Family's inaugural "Great American Christmas" film lineup.

On April 19, 2022, it was announced that GAC Media had hired Candace Cameron Bure—who had a long-standing relationship with Hallmark Channel dating back to 2008—as its chief content officer, and that she would develop, produce and star in original romantic comedies and holiday content for its networks.

During GAC Media's first upfronts presentation in April 2022, Abbott told Broadcasting & Cable that the quick transition to GAC Family did not give them enough time to promote the channel to advertisers—many of whom had already made their advertising commitments for the fourth quarter—leaving it unable to fully capitalize from the Christmas holiday season in 2021. However, Abbott felt that the market would be "pretty strong" in 2022, and believed that the network was "certainly selling family-friendly content and quality original movies with talent that people love and resonate with viewers". He also revealed plans for new digital platforms, including a free ad-supported streaming service known as "Great American Adventure", and a "fan portal" that would allow users to interact with GAC talent.

In July 2022, GAC Media—which concurrently changed its trade name to Great American Media—announced that GAC Family would be slightly rebranded as Great American Family on August 20, 2022.

Programming

Great American Family is positioned as a family-oriented channel with original series and movies emphasizing "relationships and the emotional connections related to holidays, seasons and occasions", and programming reflecting "American culture, lifestyle and heritage".  Abbott stated that the network planned to feature "soft faith" and secular programming, describing the market for faith-based programming as being "grossly underserved".

The network acquired season 2 of When Hope Calls, a spin-off of Hallmark Channel's When Calls the Heart that originally aired on the network's streaming service Hallmark Movies Now. In February 2022, it acquired reruns of the Full House sequel series Fuller House, which was originally produced for Netflix. Following the cancellation of Hallmark Channel's annual Kitten Bowl special (a feline-centric parallel to Animal Planet's annual Puppy Bowl special, which airs on the day of the Super Bowl), the network announced that it would present a similar event known as the Great American Rescue Bowl in 2023, with host Beth Stern moving over to the new program.

Under its previous ownership, original programming included series such as Kimberly's Simply Southern, a cooking show featuring Kimberly Schlapman (member of the country music group Little Big Town), Farm Kings, a reality show chronicling the King family of Freedom Farms; and Celebrity Motorhomes. It also featured reruns of shows from former Scripps Networks Interactive sister networks that suited the network's format. From 2011 through 2013, GAC broadcast the National Finals Rodeo.

Content standards 
In a November 2022 interview with The Wall Street Journal, chief creative officer Candace Cameron Bure stated of her desire to produce movies with stronger faith-based themes for Great American Family, explaining that GAC "wanted to promote faith programming and good family entertainment". She stated, "I think that Great American Family will keep traditional marriage at the core." Of Bure's implication that Great American Media productions would never depict same-sex couples, Abbott responded, "It's certainly the year 2022, so we're aware of the trends. There's no whiteboard that says, 'Yes, this' or 'No, we'll never go here.'"

Bure's remarks were believed to be an allusion to the increasing use of progressive themes—such as recognition of LGBT relationships—in Hallmark Channel productions, leading to criticism from members and supporters of the LGBT community. In response to the criticism, Bure stated that people of various "identities" worked on Great American Media programming, and that "all of you who know me, know beyond question that I have great love and affection for all people." In December 2022, actor Neal Bledsoe announced via social media that he would end his relationship with GAC Media, stating that "the thought that my work could be used to deliberately discriminate against anyone horrifies and infuriates me", and that "I could never forgive myself for continuing my relationship with a network that actively chooses to exclude the LGBTQIA+ community".

Carriage 
On November 5, 2010, AT&T U-verse dropped Great American Country, and then-sister networks Food Network, Cooking Channel, HGTV, and DIY Network, due to a carriage dispute over an increase in retransmission fees. Two days later the dispute was resolved.

In October 2021, GAC Media reached an agreement with over-the-top service Frndly TV.

In November 2021, Philo and GAC Media reached a deal to add GAC Living and GAC Family to the service beginning in early December 2021.

See also 

 Up TV

References

External links
 

Mass media in Nashville, Tennessee
Companies based in Nashville, Tennessee
Conservative media in the United States
Television channels and stations established in 1995
English-language television stations in the United States
Former E. W. Scripps Company subsidiaries